Claude McKenzie (born 1967 in Schefferville, Quebec) is a Canadian singer-songwriter. An Innu from Maliotenam, he was half of the popular folk music duo Kashtin, the most commercially successful musical group in First Nations history.

He released his debut solo album, Innu Town, in 1997. Two years later, he was seriously injured in a car accident. He released his second album, Pishimuss ("Little Moon" or "December"), in 2004.

After two years of "rediscovering his talent", McKenzie made a recording comeback in 2009 with the album Inniu ("He Lives") with Montreal producer François Lesage who offered McKenzie to record this album with his ex-partner of the group Kashtin, Florent Vollant. Lesage also helped McKenzie to write the only French song of the album, "Nous". There is also an English song, "Away". All other songs are written in Innu, a native language found in the province of Québec as well as Newfoundland and Labrador; as was the case for the three albums recorded by Kashtin in the late 1980s and early 1990s.

Discography

Albums

Singles

References

1967 births
20th-century First Nations people
21st-century First Nations people
Canadian folk singer-songwriters
Canadian male singer-songwriters
First Nations musicians
Living people
Innu people
People from Côte-Nord
Singers from Quebec